This was the fifteenth European Championship and was won for the second time by the Other Nationalities.

Results

Final standings

References

European Nations Cup
European rugby league championship
European rugby league championship
International rugby league competitions hosted by the United Kingdom
International rugby league competitions hosted by France